Chill Factor is a 1999 American buddy action comedy thriller film directed by Hugh Johnson (in his directorial debut) and starring Cuba Gooding Jr. and Skeet Ulrich. The film centers on two unwitting civilians who are forced to protect a deadly chemical weapon from the hands of a group of mercenaries planning to sell the weapon to the highest bidder. The film had a negative reviews from film critics, and was one of the biggest box office flops in history, grossing $11.8 million worldwide on a $34 million budget and was loss for Warner Bros' $64 million projectors.

Plot
Ten years after a covert military experiment on a remote Pacific island went wrong and killed eighteen US servicemen and with a medical assistant also dead, Dr. Richard Long is still trying to forget the havoc and death that his experiment caused.

Living in the small town of Jerome, Montana, Long still conducts scientific experiments at the local base, but far more enjoys his time fly-fishing with Tim Mason, who works in the local greasy spoon and has a checkered past.

Long's life changes, and then ends, when he's visited by Colonel Andrew Brynner, a former Army officer who took the blame and served ten years in Leavenworth for Long's experiment.

Now a free man with a score to settle with the government, Brynner has assembled a team of mercenaries, including a blonde woman named Vaughn, and plans to steal and then sell "Elvis"—Long's highly volatile, blue crystal substance—to the highest global bidder, thus having his revenge against the government for covering up its existence, and making him a patsy for their handling of the weapon.

Brynner and his team attack the US Army research center where the chemical weapon is being stored, the attack killing some of the Army MP's who were stationed at the base.

Unfortunately for Brynner, Long has already delivered "Elvis" to Tim, along with the directions that the substance must remain below fifty degrees, or it will detonate, and kill everyone within several hundred miles of it.

After Mason and Arlo, a wisecracking ice cream delivery man, have a run-in with Brynner, they set off en route for Fort Magruder, some ninety miles away. The two don't get along with each other—Arlo only agrees to transport the substance in his ice cream truck because Mason held a gun on him—but they find a common bond in trying to avoid Brynner and his team.

With the help of Colonel Leo Vitelli, Arlo and Mason try to survive Brynner's attacks, avoid the local deputy, Pappas, who's also hot on their trail, and keep "Elvis" below fifty degrees.

Arlo and Mason finally reach the base, but get ambushed by Brynner and his team who plan on detonating the device in an abandoned weapons test facility. Brynner does not want to leave witnesses, and decides to kill both of them. The military arrives and rescues Arlo and Mason before the device explodes, killing Brynner and his men. Colonel Vitelli arrives and congratulates them on a job well done, but Arlo and Mason threaten to expose the U.S. government for using unstable nuclear weapons for the past decade. Vitelli decides to pay them both to keep them silent, but also threatens to have them killed if they say a word about what had happened. All three of them leave the area in a helicopter.

Cast
 Cuba Gooding Jr. as Arlo
 Skeet Ulrich as Tim Mason
 Peter Firth as Colonel Andrew Brynner
 David Paymer as Dr. Richard Long
 Hudson Leick as Vaughn
 Daniel Hugh Kelly as Colonel Leo Vitelli
 Kevin J. O'Connor as Telstar
 Rhoda Griffis as Pregnant Woman
 Jordan Mott as Carl
 Judson Mills as Dennis
 David "Shark" Fralick as Blonde Biker
 Geoff Palmer as Vitelli's Helicopter Pilot
 Ray McCort as Helicopter Pilot

Production

Skeet Ulrich and Cuba Gooding Jr. were both cast in September 1998. Principal photography began on October 5, 1998. Although the film is set in Montana, most of the film was shot in Liberty, South Carolina for the diner sequences. and parts of Northeastern Utah, in particular the Flaming Gorge Dam. Production was completed on December 22, 1998.

Release
Chill Factor was released on September 1, 1999 in 2,558 theatres, and it made $5,810,531 in its opening weekend. The film was a critical and commercial failure at the box office, grossing a total of $11,788,676, well below its $34 million budget.

Reception

Box office
Chill Factor was a box office bomb, grossing only $11.2 million on a budget of $34 million.

Critical reception
The film generally received negative reviews. On Rotten Tomatoes, it has an approval rating of 9% based on 78 reviews, with an average rating of 3.5/10. The site's consensus states: "Claiming it fails on every level, critics had almost nothing good to say about this movie." Metacritic reports a score of 33 out of 100 based on 25 reviews, indicating "generally unfavorable reviews." Audiences polled by CinemaScore gave the film an average grade of "B−" on an A+ to F scale.

Roger Ebert described the film as "cliché" in every sense of the word. Total Film magazine reviewed the film favourably, awarding it 3 stars out of 5.

References

External links
 
 
 
 

1999 films
1999 action thriller films
1999 directorial debut films
American action thriller films
Films scored by Hans Zimmer
Films scored by John Powell
Films set in Montana
Films shot in South Carolina
Films shot in Utah
Morgan Creek Productions films
Warner Bros. films
1990s English-language films
1990s American films
Films shot in Monument Valley